Cyrillization of Greek refers to the transcription or transliteration of text from the Greek alphabet to the Cyrillic script.

Modern Greek to Russian

The following system has been used for Cyrillization of Modern Greek into Russian.

See also
Cyrillization
Romanization of Greek

References

Greek
Greek language